Blastobasis balucis is a moth in the  family Blastobasidae. It is found in Costa Rica.

The length of the forewings is 4.8–8.9 mm. The forewings are brownish grey intermixed with brownish-grey scales tipped with pale brownish grey and pale brownish-grey scales. The hindwings are translucent pale brown.

Etymology
The specific epithet is derived from Latin balux (meaning gold dust).

References

Moths described in 2013
Blastobasis